"Closer to Your Heart" is a song by Irish folk rock group Clannad. It was Clannad's first single that was solely considered as pop music.

Parts of the video for the single were shot at the Ponderosa venue on Glenshane Pass near Derry.

Track listing
"Closer to Your Heart"
"Buachaill Ón Éirne"

References

1985 singles
Clannad songs
1985 songs
Songs written by Ciarán Brennan
RCA Records singles